Ricardo Gascón (1910–1988) was a Spanish screenwriter and film director. A Catalan, Gascón generally worked at the Orphea Studios in Barcelona. He directed fourteen films during his career.

Selected filmography

Director
 Gentleman Thief (1946)
 When the Angels Sleep (1947)
 That Luzmela Girl (1949)
 Unexpected Conflict (1948)
 A Thief Has Arrived (1950)
 Child of the Night (1950)
 The King's Mail (1951)
 Misión extravagante (1954)

References

Bibliography 
 de España, Rafael. Directory of Spanish and Portuguese film-makers and films. Greenwood Press, 1994.

External links 
 

1910 births
1988 deaths
Spanish film directors
Spanish male screenwriters
People from Barcelona
20th-century Spanish screenwriters
20th-century Spanish male writers